Cyprus competed at the 2013 Mediterranean Games in Mersin, Turkey from the 20th to 30 June 2013.

Medalists

Rowing 

Men

Women

Sailing 

Men

Swimming 

Men

References

Cyprus Medals

Nations at the 2013 Mediterranean Games
2013
Mediterranean Games